Dioscorea rosei is a vine in the family Dioscoreaceae. It is endemic to Ecuador and it is threatened by habitat destruction.

References

rosei